First Alliance Bank Zambia Limited (FABZL), also known as First Alliance Bank (Zambia), is a commercial bank in Zambia. It is licensed by Bank of Zambia, the central bank and national banking regulator.

Location
The headquarters and main branch of the bank are located in Alliance House, at 627 Cairo Road, in the city of Lusaka, the capital and largest city of Zambia. The geographical coordinates of the bank's headquarters are: 15°25'25.0"S, 28°16'57.0"E (Latitude:-15.423611; Longitude:28.282500).

Overview
FABZL is a small financial services provider in Zambia, providing retail banking services to the communities it serves. Its niche market is the corporate clients in the mining and manufacturing sectors of the Zambian economy. , the bank controlled total assets of ZMW:940,577,000 (US$36.5 million), with shareholders' equity of ZMW:234,359,000 (US$9.1 million). At that time the bank employed 112 people.

History
The bank was founded in 1994 by four businessmen, each controlling an equal shareholding position. Starting with one branch in Lusaka, Zambia's capital  and largest city, the bank opened branches in other cities and towns in the country, focusing on the copper-belt region of the country.

Ownership
The stock of First Alliance Bank Zambia Limited is privately held by five individuals. The table below shows the ownership percentage of each shareholder, as of September 2019:

Branch network
The bank maintains five branches in the country, at the following locations, as of May 2018.

 Main Branch: Alliance House, Cairo Road, Lusaka
 Industrial Branch: 5126 Lumumba Road, Lusaka
 East Park Branch: East Park Mall, First Floor, Unit D, at the corner of Thabo Mbeki Road and Great East Road, Lusaka
 Kitwe Branch: 8721 City Gate Office Park, President Avenue, Kitwe
 Ndola Branch: 16A President Avenue, Ndola.

Governance
The Chairman of the seven-person Board of Directors is Sanmukh R. Patel. The Managing Director is Kuldip Paliwal. The chairman is a shareholder in the bank.

See also
List of banks in Zambia
Bank of Zambia
Economy of Zambia

References

External links
Website of FABZL
Website of Bank of Zambia 
First Alliance Bank workers go for a year without pay

Banks of Zambia
Companies based in Lusaka
Banks established in 1994
1994 establishments in Zambia